Saino ( is a hit 1988 Nepali film directed by Ugyen Chopel. It starred Danny Denzongpa, Bhuwan K.C., Tripti Nadakar and child actor Raksha. The music of the film was composed by Ranjit Gazmer. Danny Denzongpa wrote the story of the film and Tulsi Ghimire scripted the dialogues. The film's success led to its remake of a Hindi film Bandhu (1992 film). A TV serial titled Ajnabee was also made that was based on Saino.

Film
Tripti (Tripti) is married to Akaash (Bhuwan K.C.) and they have a son Binu. Fed up with their lives in another country, they move to their own homeland. They live happily there. One day, when Akaash visits the city, he meets a lady named Asha. Slowly, they begin an illegitimate relationship. The news comes to Tripti that her husband died in an accident and his dead body is brought home. Tripti carries on with her life with Binu until Danny comes to stay at her house. Danny develops a strong friendship with Binu.
 
A bad guy name Madan Babu has an evil eye on Tripti. He tries to force Tripti to be his wife but he does not succeed as Danny stops him. This doesn't stop Madan Babu, so he tries to provoke the villagers about their relationship and plans to kick out Tripti from the village. Danny gives the villagers an answer and proves that Madan is a bad guy. The villagers beat up Madan and his goons.

An old lady tells them they might have to face more Madans, so it would be better if they get married to each other or else leave the village. As Danny is about to approach Tripti, the police come and arrest Danny telling Tripti that he is the man who killed her husband. Danny is shocked to know that Tripti is the wife of the man he had killed because he had caught the man and his wife Asha making love with each other. Asha too was killed for betraying him. Danny asks Tripti to forgive him and tells her how his wife betrayed him. After this, he leaves the house. Tripti forgives him and tells him that she and her son Binu will be waiting for him.

Cast 
 Bhuwan K.C. as Akaash
 Tripti Nadakar as Tripti 
 Danny Denzongpa as Captain
 Muralidhar as Madan Babu.

Soundtrack

Ranjit Gazmer composed scores with a special element of Rahul Dev Burman which he learned from him .

References

External links
 Saino songs

Nepalese drama films
Nepali-language films
1987 films
Films shot in Sikkim
Films shot in Mumbai
Films scored by Ranjit Gazmer